This is a partial list of places in Greater Manchester, in North West England.

Metropolitan boroughs and components

Civil parishes

Parliamentary constituencies

Bodies of water

Rivers

 River Beal
 River Bollin
 River Croal
 River Douglas
 River Etherow
 River Goyt
 River Irk
 River Irwell
 River Medlock
 River Mersey
 River Roch
 River Spodden
 River Tame
 Glaze Brook

Canals

 Ashton Canal
 Beat Bank Branch Canal
 Bridgewater Canal
 Fairbottom Branch Canal
 Hollinwood Branch Canal
 Huddersfield Narrow Canal
 Islington Branch Canal
 Leeds and Liverpool Canal
 Manchester Ship Canal
 Manchester, Bolton and Bury Canal
 Peak Forest Canal
 Rochdale Canal
 Stockport Branch Canal

Reservoirs

 Ashworth Moor Reservoir
 Audenshaw Reservoirs
 Besom Hill Reservoir
 Black Moss Reservoir
 Blackstone Edge Reservoir
 Brownhouse Wham Reservoir
 Brushes Reservoir
 Brushes Clough Reservoir
 Castleshaw Reservoir
 Chelburn Reservoir
 Chew Reservoir
 Crook Gate Reservoir
 Denton Reservoirs
 Diggle Reservoir
 Dovestones Reservoir
 Dowry Reservoir
 Godley Reservoir
 Gorton Reservoirs
 Greenbooth Reservoir
 Greenfield Reservoir
 Hamer Pasture Reservoir
 Hanging Lees Reservoir
 Heaton Park Reservoir
 High Rid Reservoir
 Higher Swineshaw Reservoir
 Hollingworth Lake
 Jumbles Reservoir
 Kitcliffe Reservoir
 Light Hazzles Reservoir
 Lower Chelburn Reservoir
 Lower Swineshaw Reservoir
 Manchester, Bolton and Bury Reservoir
 Naden Reservoirs (Higher, Middle and Lower)
 New Years Bridge Reservoir
 Norman Hill Reservoir
 Ogden Reservoir
 Piethorne Reservoir
 Readycon Dean Reservoir
 Rooden Reservoir
 Rumworth Lodge Reservoir
 Strinesdale Reservoir
 Swineshaw Reservoirs
 Yeoman Hey Reservoir
 Walkerwood Reservoir
 Watergrove Reservoir
 Worthington Lakes

Docks
 Salford Quays

Hills, valleys, moorland and mosses

 Astley and Bedford Mosses
 Black Chew Head
 Blackstone Edge
 Carrington Moss
 Chat Moss
 Chew Valley
 Cheesden Valley
 Crompton Moor
 Harridge Pike
 Hartshead Pike
 Kersal Moor
 Pennine Way
 Red Moss, Greater Manchester
 Saddleworth Moor
 West Pennine Moors
 Wild Bank

Notable buildings

Buckton Castle
Bury Castle
Dunham Castle
Manchester Castle
Radcliffe Tower
Rochdale Castle
Stockport Castle
Ullerwood Castle
Watch Hill Castle

Places of worship

 Manchester Cathedral
 Salford Cathedral
 Gorton Monastery
 Khizra mosque
 Noor Mosque

Schools and colleges
 Manchester Metropolitan University
 University of Bolton
 University of Manchester
 University of Salford

Roads and streets

Motorways
 M6 motorway
 M60 motorway
 M602 motorway
 M62 motorway
 M67 motorway
 A57(M) motorway (Mancunian Way)

Notable roads
Wilmslow Road

Parks, commons and open space
 Alexandra Park, Manchester
 Alexandra Park, Oldham
 Ardwick Green
 Birchfields Park, Manchester
 Boggart Hole Clough
 Cale Green Park
 Chadderton Hall Park
 Chorlton Water Park
 Clayton Vale
 Crumpsall Park
 Fletcher Moss Botanical Garden
 Heaton Park
 Kersal Moor
 Leverhulme Park
 Mesnes Park
 Peel Park, Salford
 Philips Park, Clayton
 Platt Fields Park, Manchester
 Queen's Park, Bolton
 Sale Water Park
 Whitworth Gardens
 Whitworth Park, Manchester

Country parks
 Borsdane Wood
 Burrs Country Park
 Clifton Country Park; Clifton Marina
 Daisy Nook
 Haigh Country Park
 Jumbles Country Park
 Moses Gate Country Park
 Pennington Flash Country Park
 Tandle Hill

Squares and gardens
 Cathedral Gardens
 Piccadilly Gardens
 St Michael's Flags and Angel Meadow Park
Sackville Gardens on Whitworth Street

Cemeteries
 Agecroft Cemetery
 Blackley Cemetery
 Southern Cemetery, Manchester
 Weaste Cemetery

Public transport

Railway stations

Airports
 Barton Aerodrome
 Manchester Airport

References

List
Greater Manchester
Places